Them Days may refer to:

"Them Days", song by Crazy Town from Darkhorse (album)  
"Them Days", song by The New Toronto
"Them Days", song from Dex Meets Dexter